Enrico Adanti is a former Italian racing driver. He entered 22 races between 1938 and 1940, and between 1946 and 1953, mainly driving a Fiat or Lancia. He started the Mille Miglia 9 times.

Complete results

References
 Racing Sports Cars
 Ultimate Racing History
 Pre-War Sports Car Races

Citations

Year of birth unknown
Italian racing drivers
Mille Miglia drivers